Villalona is a surname. Notable people with the surname include:

Angel Villalona (born 1990), Dominican Republic baseball player
Fernando Villalona (born 1955), Dominican Republic singer